Carlo Alzona was an Italian  medical doctor, an entomologist and a malacologist. He was born on 26 May 1881 at  Turin and died on 14 May 1961 at Genoa.

He was the director of  the Muséum de Genoa from 1947 to 1955. He specialised in Coleoptera.

References

1881 births
1961 deaths
Italian entomologists
Italian malacologists
20th-century Italian physicians
Coleopterists
Scientists from Turin
20th-century Italian zoologists
Physicians from Turin